Pazha Nedumaran Krishnan Pillai Pazhaniyappan is a Tamil politician from the state of Tamil Nadu, India. He is an ex-national Congressman, a writer and Tamil nationalist, who has authored many books in Tamil and English. Pazha Nedumaran was born in Madurai. He graduated from The American College in Madurai.  He was a close associate of K. Kamaraj, and had met Indira Gandhi a couple of times in the company of K. Kamaraj. He was reportedly disillusioned with the Congress after Kamaraj's demise. He is the editor-in-chief of the by-weekly Tamil magazine Then Seidi. He is the leader of the Tamil Nationalist Movement and the இலங்கைத் தமிழர் பாதுகாப்பு இயக்க ஒருங்கிணைப்பாளர்.

His son Palani Kumanan is a software engineer in The Wall Street Journal and shared the Pulitzer Prize for 2015.

Socio-political activities

Political 
 1979, when the All India Congress President and former Prime Minister of India Mrs.Indira Gandhi visited Tamil Nadu, she was attacked by goons affiliated to D.M.K., Mr.Nedumaran who accompanied her in an open top jeep, shielded her and bore the brutal attacks on his body and saved her life. After winning the Lok Sabha elections, Mrs Indira Gandhi invited him to Delhi where she expressed her gratitude by offering him Union Minister post. He politely declined. She called him her eldest son as he saved her life.

Human Rights 

 When Kannada film actor Dr. Rajkumar was abducted by the notorious dacoit Veerappan, there arose a tense situation in the adjoining states of Tamil Nadu and Karnataka. The situation was such that at any time racial riots could break out resulting in arson and killings of thousands and thousands of innocent people. As such, on the requisition by the Chief Ministers of both states, a team of emissaries led by Nedumaran, went into the forests, met Veerappan and rescued Dr. Rajkumar.
 2007, he organised a campaign to collect food and medicines for the people starving in Jaffna, due to the economic blockade of the Sri Lankan Government. Aids worth Rs. 10 million were collected. He sought the help of the Indian Red Cross Society to send the aid to Jaffna. Indian Red Cross Society readily agreed and in turn sought the permission of the Indian Government to carry the aids. But the Indian Government did not respond for more than 10 months. Nedumaran demonstrated several agitations seeking the Indian Government to grant permission. As all were in vain, he announced that he and his comrades would carry the aids to Jaffna by boats from Rameshwaram and Nagapattinam, the coastal towns of Tamil Nadu. The Tamil Nadu Police stopped him from doing so. Hence he undertook a fast-unto-death until a solution was attained for this issue. The fast lasted for 4 days and after the assurance from the Chief Minister of Tamil Nadu through Dr. Ramadoss, Convener, PMK, he completed the fast.

Tamil Eelam 

 1985, Nedumaran made a secret tour in the Tamil areas of Sri Lanka, and video graphed the atrocities committed by the Sri Lanka army there; and documented the consequences of the atrocities. He then toured the world with this evidence, and brought global attention to the issue.

References

External links
 Then Seide
 Blog
 
 I'm just a supporter of LTTE: Nedumaran
 P Nedumaran arrested in Nagapattinam
 
  News on Nedumaran
 பழ. நெடுமாறனின் உண்ணாவிரதப் போராட்டம்
 

Politicians from Madurai
Living people
1933 births
Tamil Nadu politicians
Annamalai University alumni
20th-century Indian politicians